This is a list of the queen consorts of the major kingdoms that existed in present-day Myanmar. Those with the rank of  Nan Mibaya  (senior queens) are listed.

Primer

Rankings of consorts

Prior to the Konbaung period (1752–1885), the consorts of the Burmese monarchs were organized in three general tiers: Nan Mibaya (နန်းမိဖုရား, lit. "Queen of the Palace", senior queen), Mibaya (Nge) (မိဖုရား (ငယ်), "(Junior) Queen"), and Ko-lok-taw (ကိုယ်လုပ်တော်, concubine). Starting in the late 18th century, the Konbaung kings inserted the tiers of Hsaungdaw Mibaya (ဆောင်တော် မိဖုရား, lit. "Queen of the Royal Apartment") and Shwe-Yay Hsaung Mibaya (ရွှေရေးဆောင် မိဖုရား, lit. "Queen of the Gilded Chamber") between the tiers of senior queen and junior queen.

Ladies in waiting such as Apyo-daw (အပျိုတော်, "maiden") and Maung-ma (မောင်းမ, "handmaid") were part of the general staff of the palace.

Senior queens
Each tier had further rankings within it. The order of precedence within the topmost tier was:

Aside from a few rare exceptions, the Queen of the Southern Palace was the official chief queen consort. In theory, the chief queen consort alone had the right to a white umbrella and to sit with the King on the royal throne.

Junior queens

Concubines
Concubines were called Ko-lok-taw (ကိုယ်လုပ်တော်, lit. "one who administers to the royal body") or Chay-daw-din (ခြေတော်တင်, lit. "one on whom the royal feet are placed").

Names
The names of the queens, if known, are given according to their most well known common name, which often happens to be the primary name used by the royal chronicles. The chronicle reported names of the queens may be their popular/commonly known name (e.g., Pwa Saw, Nanmadaw Me Nu); formal title (e.g., Agga Mahethi, Sanda Dewi); personal name (e.g., Shin Bo-Me, Yun San); or generic name of the office (Hanthawaddy Mibaya, "Queen of Hanthawaddy"; or Myauk Pyinthe, "Queen of the Northern Palace"). Finally, the names of the queens with no known records are given as "(Unknown)".

Duration of consortship
The "Became consort" and "Ceased to be consort" dates indicate the period in which a given queen was in the role of royal consort—not the duration of marriage.

Pagan dynasty

Early Pagan

Pagan Empire

Small kingdoms

Myinsaing

Pinya

Sagaing

Ava

House of Myinsaing

Confederation of Shan states

Prome

Ramanya

Arakan

House of Launggyet

Late Mrauk-U

Toungoo dynasty

House of Toungoo

House of Nyaungyan

Restored Hanthawaddy

Konbaung dynasty

See also
List of Burmese leaders
List of Burmese monarchs
Burmese monarchs' family tree

Notes

References

Bibliography
 
 
 
 
 
 
 
 
 
 
 
 
 
 
 
 
 
 
 

Burmese
Royal consorts
Burmese